The Bryansk Forest Nature Reserve (also, Bryansky Les) is a nature reserve in Bryansk Oblast, Russia along the Nerussa River (a tributary of the Desna River) near the Russian border with Ukraine.

The forest is a nature reserve ("Zapovednik"), and is integral part of the Nerussa-Desna Woodland UNESCO-MAB Biosphere Reserve, important for protecting the "diversity and integrity of the broadleaf forest in European Russia." It is one of the last remaining unbroken forests on the southern end of the European broadleaf forest, supporting abundant wildlife in the forests and bogs.

Topography
The Bryansk Nature Reserve is part of the Nerusso-Desna woodland, a UNESCO-MAB Biosphere Reserve. This biosphere has been established on the bases of a well-developed network of protected areas, which are connected ecologically. The Bryansk Forest is located in the basin of the middle reaches of the Desna river, a left tributary of the Dnieper River on the border of Ukraine). The terrain is flat: the minimum height above sea level - 134.5 m (at the level of the Nerussa River; the maximum is 189.4 m.  The dry land is dominated by sandy and loamy soils; in flood plains, meadows and alluvial lowlands there are bog soils. The Bryansk forests have diminished in size over time, and were once considered dense. 

Across the Ukrainian border is the Ukraine's Desnyansko-Starogutsky National Park, which has a forested section that has similar habitat similar to Bransksy's.

Ecoregion and Climate
Bryansky Les is located in the Central European mixed forests ecoregion, a temperate hardwood forest covering much of northeastern Europe, from Germany to Russia.

The climate of Bryansky Les is Humid continental climate, warm summer (Köppen climate classification (Dfb)). This climate is characterized by large swings in temperature, both diurnally and seasonally, with mild summers and cold, snowy winters.

Plants and animals
The vegetation in the reserve features widespread pine and pine-oak forests on poor, sandy soils. Zonal spruce and deciduous broad-leaved forests are rare. The forest contrasts with the surrounding agricultural landscape. In the areas adjacent to the reserve there is an established network of state reserves and natural monuments of regional importance, the protection and administration of which is carried out jointly with the reserve land users.

The animals in the reserve are typical of the southern range of the mixed boreal-forest subdomain of the Palaearctic region: grouse, boreal owl, hare, lynx, brown bear, and others. Bison were brought to the reserve in 2011.

The Bryansk forest is the only place in Europe where there are all ten of the European woodpeckers: great spotted woodpecker, middle spotted, lesser spotted woodpecker, Syrian, white-backed, black woodpecker, grey, green, three-toed and Wryneck.

See also
 List of Russian Nature Reserves (class 1a 'zapovedniks')

References

External links
 Official Website, Bryansk Les Zapovednik
 Desnyano-Starogusky National Park (Ukraine) - across border from Bransky Forest

Nature reserves in Russia
Biosphere reserves of Russia
Geography of Bryansk Oblast
Zapovednik
Central European mixed forests